The 1944–45 Idaho Vandals men's basketball team represented the University of Idaho during the 1944–45 NCAA college basketball season. Members of the Pacific Coast Conference, the Vandals were led by third-year acting head coach James "Babe" Brown and played their home games on campus at Memorial Gymnasium in Moscow, Idaho.

References

External links
Sports Reference – Idaho Vandals: 1944–45 basketball season
Gem of the Mountains: 1945 University of Idaho yearbook – 1944–45 basketball season
Idaho Argonaut – student newspaper – 1945 editions

Idaho Vandals men's basketball seasons
Idaho
Idaho
Idaho